Hyron is a given name. It may refer to:

Hyron Andrews (born 1995), South African rugby union player 
Hyron Fenton (born 1987), birth name of the artist Hyro the Hero
Hyron Shallow (born 1982), West Indies cricketer from Saint Vincent and the Grenadines)
Hyron Spinrad (1934–2015), American astronomer